

Peerage of England

|Duke of Cornwall (1337)||none||1649||1688||
|-
|Duke of Buckingham (1623)||George Villiers, 2nd Duke of Buckingham||1628||1687||
|-
|rowspan="2"|Duke of Richmond (1641)||James Stewart, 1st Duke of Richmond||1641||1655||Died
|-
|Esmé Stewart, 2nd Duke of Richmond||1655||1660||
|-
|Duke of Cumberland (1644)||Prince Rupert of the Rhine||1644||1682||
|-
|Duke of York (1644)||James Stuart||1644||1685||
|-
|Duke of Gloucester (1659)||Henry Stuart, Duke of Gloucester||1659||1660||New creation
|-
|Marquess of Winchester (1551)||John Paulet, 5th Marquess of Winchester||1628||1675||
|-
|Marquess of Hertford (1641)||William Seymour, 1st Marquess of Hertford||1641||1660||
|-
|Marquess of Worcester (1642)||Edward Somerset, 2nd Marquess of Worcester||1646||1667||
|-
|Marquess of Newcastle-upon-Tyne (1643)||William Cavendish, 1st Marquess of Newcastle-upon-Tyne||1643||1676||
|-
|Marquess of Dorchester (1645)||Henry Pierrepont, 1st Marquess of Dorchester||1645||1680||
|-
|rowspan="2"|Earl of Arundel (1138)||Henry Howard, 22nd Earl of Arundel||1646||1652||Died
|-
|Thomas Howard, 23rd Earl of Arundel||1652||1677||
|-
|Earl of Oxford (1142)||Aubrey de Vere, 20th Earl of Oxford||1632||1703||
|-
|rowspan="2"|Earl of Shrewsbury (1442)||John Talbot, 10th Earl of Shrewsbury||1630||1654||Died
|-
|Francis Talbot, 11th Earl of Shrewsbury||1654||1668||
|-
|rowspan="2"|Earl of Kent (1465)||Henry Grey, 10th Earl of Kent||1643||1651||Died
|-
|Anthony Grey, 11th Earl of Kent||1651||1702||
|-
|rowspan="2"|Earl of Derby (1485)||James Stanley, 7th Earl of Derby||1642||1651||Died
|-
|Charles Stanley, 8th Earl of Derby||1651||1672||
|-
|Earl of Rutland (1525)||John Manners, 8th Earl of Rutland||1641||1679||
|-
|rowspan="2"|Earl of Huntingdon (1529)||Ferdinando Hastings, 6th Earl of Huntingdon||1643||1656||Died
|-
|Theophilus Hastings, 7th Earl of Huntingdon||1656||1701||
|-
|Earl of Bath (1536)||Henry Bourchier, 5th Earl of Bath||1636||1654||Died, title extinct
|-
|Earl of Southampton (1547)||Thomas Wriothesley, 4th Earl of Southampton||1624||1667||Succeeded as 2nd Earl of Chichester
|-
|Earl of Bedford (1550)||William Russell, 5th Earl of Bedford||1641||1700||
|-
|Earl of Pembroke (1551)||Philip Herbert, 5th Earl of Pembroke||1649||1669||
|-
|Earl of Devon (1553)||William Courtenay, de jure 5th Earl of Devon||1638||1702||
|-
|Earl of Northumberland (1557)||Algernon Percy, 10th Earl of Northumberland||1632||1668||
|-
|Earl of Lincoln (1572)||Theophilus Clinton, 4th Earl of Lincoln||1619||1667||
|-
|Earl of Nottingham (1596)||Charles Howard, 3rd Earl of Nottingham||1642||1681||
|-
|Earl of Suffolk (1603)||James Howard, 3rd Earl of Suffolk||1640||1689||
|-
|rowspan="2"|Earl of Dorset (1604)||Edward Sackville, 4th Earl of Dorset||1624||1652||Died
|-
|Richard Sackville, 5th Earl of Dorset||1652||1677||
|-
|Earl of Exeter (1605)||David Cecil, 3rd Earl of Exeter||1643||1678||
|-
|Earl of Salisbury (1605)||William Cecil, 2nd Earl of Salisbury||1612||1668||
|-
|Earl of Bridgewater (1617)||John Egerton, 2nd Earl of Bridgewater||1649||1686||
|-
|Earl of Northampton (1618)||James Compton, 3rd Earl of Northampton||1643||1681||
|-
|Earl of Leicester (1618)||Robert Sidney, 2nd Earl of Leicester||1626||1677||
|-
|rowspan="3"|Earl of Warwick (1618)||Robert Rich, 2nd Earl of Warwick||1618||1658||Died
|-
|Robert Rich, 3rd Earl of Warwick||1658||1659||Died
|-
|Charles Rich, 4th Earl of Warwick||1659||1673||
|-
|Earl of Devonshire (1618)||William Cavendish, 3rd Earl of Devonshire||1628||1684||
|-
|Earl of Cambridge (1619)||William Hamilton, 3rd Earl of Cambridge||1649||1651||Duke of Hamilton in the Peerage of Scotland; died, Earldom extinct
|-
|Earl of Carlisle (1622)||James Hay, 2nd Earl of Carlisle||1636||1660||
|-
|Earl of Denbigh (1622)||Basil Feilding, 2nd Earl of Denbigh||1643||1675||
|-
|rowspan="2"|Earl of Bristol (1622)||John Digby, 1st Earl of Bristol||1622||1653||Died
|-
|George Digby, 2nd Earl of Bristol||1653||1677||
|-
|rowspan="2"|Earl of Middlesex (1622)||James Cranfield, 2nd Earl of Middlesex||1645||1651||Died
|-
|Lionel Cranfield, 3rd Earl of Middlesex||1651||1674||
|-
|Earl of Anglesey (1623)||Charles Villiers, 2nd Earl of Anglesey||1630||1661||
|-
|Earl of Holland (1624)||Robert Rich, 2nd Earl of Holland||1649||1675||
|-
|Earl of Clare (1624)||John Holles, 2nd Earl of Clare||1637||1666||
|-
|Earl of Bolingbroke (1624)||Oliver St John, 2nd Earl of Bolingbroke||1646||1688||
|-
|Earl of Westmorland (1624)||Mildmay Fane, 2nd Earl of Westmorland||1629||1666||
|-
|Earl of Cleveland (1626)||Thomas Wentworth, 1st Earl of Cleveland||1626||1667||
|-
|Earl of Manchester (1626)||Edward Montagu, 2nd Earl of Manchester||1642||1671||
|-
|Earl of Marlborough (1626)||James Ley, 3rd Earl of Marlborough||1638||1665||
|-
|rowspan="2"|Earl of Mulgrave (1626)||Edmund Sheffield, 2nd Earl of Mulgrave||1646||1658||Died
|-
|John Sheffield, 3rd Earl of Mulgrave||1658||1721||
|-
|Earl of Berkshire (1626)||Thomas Howard, 1st Earl of Berkshire||1626||1669||
|-
|Earl of Monmouth (1626)||Henry Carey, 2nd Earl of Monmouth||1639||1661||
|-
|rowspan="2"|Earl Rivers (1626)||John Savage, 2nd Earl Rivers||1640||1654||Died
|-
|Thomas Savage, 3rd Earl Rivers||1654||1694||
|-
|Earl of Lindsey (1626)||Montagu Bertie, 2nd Earl of Lindsey||1642||1666||
|-
|Earl of Dover (1628)||Henry Carey, 1st Earl of Dover||1628||1666||
|-
|Earl of Peterborough (1628)||Henry Mordaunt, 2nd Earl of Peterborough||1643||1697||
|-
|Earl of Stamford (1628)||Henry Grey, 1st Earl of Stamford||1628||1673||
|-
|Earl of Winchilsea (1628)||Heneage Finch, 3rd Earl of Winchilsea||1639||1689||
|-
|Earl of Carnarvon (1628)||Charles Dormer, 2nd Earl of Carnarvon||1643||1709||
|-
|Earl of Newport (1628)||Mountjoy Blount, 1st Earl of Newport||1628||1666||
|-
|rowspan="2"|Earl of Chesterfield (1628)||Philip Stanhope, 1st Earl of Chesterfield||1628||1656||Died
|-
|Philip Stanhope, 2nd Earl of Chesterfield||1656||1714||
|-
|Earl of Thanet (1628)||John Tufton, 2nd Earl of Thanet||1632||1664||
|-
|Earl of St Albans (1628)||Ulick Burke, 2nd Earl of St Albans||1635||1657||Earldom extinct; Irish titles succeeded by a cousin
|-
|Earl of Portland (1633)||Jerome Weston, 2nd Earl of Portland||1635||1663||
|-
|Earl of Strafford (1640)||none||1641||1662||Attainted
|-
|Earl Rivers (1641)||Elizabeth Savage, Countess Rivers||1641||1651||Died, title extinct
|-
|Earl of Strafford (1641)||William Wentworth, 1st Earl of Strafford||1641||1695||
|-
|Earl of Sunderland (1643)||Robert Spencer, 2nd Earl of Sunderland||1643||1702||
|-
|rowspan="2"|Earl of Sussex (1644)||Thomas Savile, 1st Earl of Sussex||1644||1659||Died
|-
|James Savile, 2nd Earl of Sussex||1659||1671||
|-
|Earl of Brentford (1644)||Patrick Ruthven, 1st Earl of Brentford||1644||1651||Died, title extinct
|-
|Earl of Chichester (1644)||Francis Leigh, 1st Earl of Chichester||1644||1653||Succeeded by the 4th Earl of Southampton, see above
|-
|Earl of Norwich (1644)||George Goring, 1st Earl of Norwich||1644||1663||
|-
|rowspan="2"|Earl of Scarsdale (1645)||Francis Leke, 1st Earl of Scarsdale||1645||1655||Died
|-
|Nicholas Leke, 2nd Earl of Scarsdale||1655||1681||
|-
|Earl of Lichfield (1645)||Charles Stewart, 1st Earl of Lichfield||1645||1672||
|-
|rowspan="2"|Earl of Rochester (1652)||Henry Wilmot, 1st Earl of Rochester||1652||1658||New creation; died
|-
|John Wilmot, 2nd Earl of Rochester||1658||1680||
|-
|rowspan="2"|Viscount Hereford (1550)||Walter Devereux, 5th Viscount Hereford||1646||1658||Died
|-
|Leicester Devereux, 6th Viscount Hereford||1658||1676||
|-
|Viscount Montagu (1554)||Francis Browne, 3rd Viscount Montagu||1629||1682||
|-
|Viscount Purbeck (1618)||John Villiers, 1st Viscount Purbeck||1619||1657||Died, title extinct
|-
|Viscount Saye and Sele (1624)||William Fiennes, 1st Viscount Saye and Sele||1624||1662||
|-
|rowspan="2"|Viscount Conway (1627)||Edward Conway, 2nd Viscount Conway||1631||1655||Died
|-
|Edward Conway, 3rd Viscount Conway||1655||1683||
|-
|Viscount Campden (1628)||Baptist Noel, 3rd Viscount Campden||1643||1682||
|-
|Viscount Stafford (1640)||William Howard, 1st Viscount Stafford||1640||1680||
|-
|rowspan="2"|Viscount Fauconberg (1643)||Thomas Belasyse, 1st Viscount Fauconberg||1643||1653||Died
|-
|Thomas Belasyse, 1st Earl Fauconberg||1652||1700||
|-
|Viscount Mordaunt (1659)||John Mordaunt, 1st Viscount Mordaunt||1659||1675||New creation
|-
|Baron de Clifford (1299)||Anne Clifford, 14th Baroness de Clifford||1605||1676||
|-
|Baron Furnivall (1299)||Alethea Howard, 13th Baron Furnivall||1651||1654||Abeyance terminated; died, Barony succeeded by the Duke of Norfolk, and held by his heirs until 1777, when it fell into abeyance
|-
|rowspan="2"|Baron Morley (1299)||Henry Parker, 14th Baron Morley||1622||1655||Died
|-
|Thomas Parker, 15th Baron Morley||1655||1697||
|-
|Baron Dacre (1321)||Francis Lennard, 14th Baron Dacre||1630||1662||
|-
|Baron Grey of Ruthyn (1325)||Susan Longueville, 13th Baroness Grey de Ruthyn||1643||1676||
|-
|rowspan="2"|Baron Darcy de Knayth (1332)||Conyers Darcy, 7th Baron Darcy de Knayth||1641||1653||Died
|-
|Conyers Darcy, 8th Baron Darcy de Knayth||1653||1689||
|-
|rowspan="2"|Baron Berkeley (1421)||George Berkeley, 8th Baron Berkeley||1613||1658||Died
|-
|George Berkeley, 9th Baron Berkeley||1658||1698||
|-
|Baron Dudley (1440)||Frances Ward, 6th Baroness Dudley||1643||1697||
|-
|Baron Stourton (1448)||William Stourton, 11th Baron Stourton||1633||1672||
|-
|Baron Willoughby de Broke (1491)||Greville Verney, 9th Baron Willoughby de Broke||1648||1668||
|-
|rowspan="2"|Baron Monteagle (1514)||Henry Parker, 5th Baron Monteagle||1622||1655||Died
|-
|Thomas Parker, 6th Baron Monteagle||1655||1697||
|-
|Baron Vaux of Harrowden (1523)||Edward Vaux, 4th Baron Vaux of Harrowden||1595||1661||
|-
|Baron Sandys of the Vine (1529)||William Sandys, 6th Baron Sandys||1645||1668||
|-
|rowspan="2"|Baron Eure (1544)||William Eure, 5th Baron Eure||1646||1652||Died
|-
|George Eure, 6th Baron Eure||1652||1672||
|-
|Baron Wharton (1545)||Philip Wharton, 4th Baron Wharton||1625||1695||
|-
|Baron Willoughby of Parham (1547)||Francis Willoughby, 5th Baron Willoughby of Parham||1618||1666||
|-
|Baron Paget (1552)||William Paget, 5th Baron Paget||1629||1678||
|-
|Baron North (1554)||Dudley North, 3rd Baron North||1600||1666||
|-
|rowspan="2"|Baron Chandos (1554)||George Brydges, 6th Baron Chandos||1621||1655||Died
|-
|William Brydges, 7th Baron Chandos||1655||1676||
|-
|Baron De La Warr (1570)||Charles West, 5th Baron De La Warr||1628||1687||
|-
|rowspan="2"|Baron Norreys (1572)||Bridget Bertie, 4th Baroness Norreys||1645||1657||Died
|-
|James Bertie, 5th Baron Norreys||1657||1699||
|-
|Baron Gerard (1603)||Charles Gerard, 4th Baron Gerard||1640||1667||
|-
|Baron Petre (1603)||William Petre, 4th Baron Petre||1638||1684||
|-
|Baron Arundell of Wardour (1605)||Henry Arundell, 3rd Baron Arundell of Wardour||1643||1694||
|-
|Baron Stanhope of Harrington (1605)||Charles Stanhope, 2nd Baron Stanhope||1621||1675||
|-
|Baron Teynham (1616)||John Roper, 3rd Baron Teynham||1628||1673||
|-
|rowspan="2"|Baron Brooke (1621)||Francis Greville, 3rd Baron Brooke||1643||1658||Died
|-
|Robert Greville, 4th Baron Brooke||1658||1677||
|-
|Baron Montagu of Boughton (1621)||Edward Montagu, 2nd Baron Montagu of Boughton||1644||1684||
|-
|Baron Grey of Warke (1624)||William Grey, 1st Baron Grey of Werke||1624||1674||
|-
|Baron Robartes (1625)||John Robartes, 2nd Baron Robartes||1625||1685||
|-
|Baron Craven (1627)||Willian Craven, 1st Baron Craven||1627||1697||
|-
|Baron Lovelace (1627)||John Lovelace, 2nd Baron Lovelace||1634||1670||
|-
|Baron Poulett (1627)||John Poulett, 2nd Baron Poulett||1649||1665||
|-
|Baron Clifford (1628)||Elizabeth Boyle, Baroness Clifford||1643||1691||
|-
|Baron Brudenell (1628)||Thomas Brudenell, 1st Baron Brudenell||1628||1663||
|-
|Baron Maynard (1628)||William Maynard, 2nd Baron Maynard||1640||1699||
|-
|Baron Coventry (1628)||Thomas Coventry, 2nd Baron Coventry||1640||1661||
|-
|Baron Mohun of Okehampton (1628)||Warwick Mohun, 2nd Baron Mohun of Okehampton||1640||1665||
|-
|Baron Boteler of Brantfield (1628)||William Boteler, 2nd Baron Boteler of Brantfield||1637||1657||Died, title extinct
|-
|rowspan="2"|Baron Powis (1629)||William Herbert, 1st Baron Powis||1629||1655||Died
|-
|Percy Herbert, 2nd Baron Powis||1655||1667||
|-
|rowspan="2"|Baron Herbert of Chirbury (1629)||Richard Herbert, 2nd Baron Herbert of Chirbury||1648||1655||Died
|-
|Edward Herbert, 3rd Baron Herbert of Chirbury||1655||1678||
|-
|Baron Cottington (1631)||Francis Cottington, 1st Baron Cottington||1631||1652||Died, title extinct
|-
|Baron Finch (1640)||John Finch, 1st Baron Finch||1640||1660||
|-
|Baron (A)bergavenny (1641)||John Nevill, 1st Baron Bergavenny||1641||1662||
|-
|Baron Seymour of Trowbridge (1641)||Francis Seymour, 1st Baron Seymour of Trowbridge||1641||1664||
|-
|Baron Capell of Hadham (1641)||Arthur Capell, 2nd Baron Capell of Hadham||1649||1683||
|-
|Baron Hatton (1642)||Christopher Hatton, 1st Baron Hatton||1642||1670||
|-
|rowspan="2"|Baron Newport (1642)||Richard Newport, 1st Baron Newport||1642||1651||Died
|-
|Francis Newport, 2nd Baron Newport||1651||1708||
|-
|Baron Percy of Alnwick (1643)||Henry Percy, Baron Percy of Alnwick||1643||1659||Died, title extinct
|-
|Baron Leigh (1643)||Thomas Leigh, 1st Baron Leigh||1643||1672||
|-
|Baron Hopton (1643)||Ralph Hopton, 1st Baron Hopton||1643||1652||Died, title extinct
|-
|Baron Jermyn (1643)||Henry Jermyn, 1st Baron Jermyn||1643||1684||
|-
|rowspan="2"|Baron Byron (1643)||John Byron, 1st Baron Byron||1643||1652||Died
|-
|Richard Byron, 2nd Baron Byron||1652||1679||
|-
|Baron Loughborough (1643)||Henry Hastings, 1st Baron Loughborough||1643||1667||
|-
|rowspan="2"|Baron Widdrington (1643)||William Widdrington, 1st Baron Widdrington||1643||1651||Died
|-
|William Widdrington, 2nd Baron Widdrington||1651||1675||
|-
|Baron Ward (1644)||Humble Ward, 1st Baron Ward||1644||1670||
|-
|Baron Colepeper (1644)||John Colepeper, 1st Baron Colepeper||1644||1660||
|-
|rowspan="2"|Baron Astley of Reading (1644)||Jacob Astley, 1st Baron Astley of Reading||1644||1652||Died
|-
|Isaac Astley, 2nd Baron Astley of Reading||1652||1662||
|-
|Baron Cobham (1645)||John Brooke, 1st Baron Cobham||1645||1660||
|-
|Baron Lucas of Shenfield (1645)||John Lucas, 1st Baron Lucas of Shenfield||1645||1671||
|-
|Baron Belasyse (1645)||John Belasyse, 1st Baron Belasyse||1645||1689||
|-
|rowspan="2"|Baron Rockingham (1645)||Lewis Watson, 1st Baron Rockingham||1645||1653||Died
|-
|Edward Watson, 2nd Baron Rockingham||1653||1689||
|-
|Baron Gerard of Brandon (1645)||Charles Gerard, 1st Baron Gerard of Brandon||1645||1694||
|-
|Baron Lexinton (1645)||Robert Sutton, 1st Baron Lexinton||1645||1668||
|-
|Baron Wotton (1650)||Charles Kirkhoven, 1st Baron Wotton||1650||1683||New creation
|-
|Baron Langdale (1658)||Marmaduke Langdale, 1st Baron Langdale||1658||1661||New creation
|-
|Baron Crofts (1658)||William Crofts, 1st Baron Crofts||1658||1677||New creation
|-
|Baron Berkeley of Stratton (1658)||John Berkeley, 1st Baron Berkeley of Stratton||1658||1678||New creation
|-
|}

Peerage of Scotland

|Duke of Rothesay (1398)||none||1649||1688||
|-
|rowspan=2|Duke of Lennox (1581)||James Stewart, 4th Duke of Lennox||1624||1655||Died
|-
|Esmé Stewart, 5th Duke of Lennox||1655||1660||
|-
|rowspan=2|Duke of Hamilton (1643)||William Hamilton, 2nd Duke of Hamilton||1649||1651||Died
|-
|Anne Hamilton, 3rd Duchess of Hamilton||1651||1698||
|-
|rowspan=2|Marquess of Huntly (1599)||Lewis Gordon, 3rd Marquess of Huntly||1649||1653||Died
|-
|George Gordon, 4th Marquess of Huntly||1653||1716||
|-
|Marquess of Douglas (1633)||William Douglas, 1st Marquess of Douglas||1633||1660||
|-
|Marquess of Argyll (1641)||Archibald Campbell, 1st Marquess of Argyll||1641||1661||
|-
|rowspan=2|Marquess of Montrose (1644)||James Graham, 1st Marquess of Montrose||1644||1650||Died
|-
|James Graham, 2nd Marquess of Montrose||1650||1669||
|-
|rowspan=2|Earl of Crawford (1398)||Ludovic Lindsay, 16th Earl of Crawford||1639||1652||Died
|-
|John Lindsay, 17th Earl of Crawford||1652||1678||
|-
|Earl of Erroll (1452)||Gilbert Hay, 11th Earl of Erroll||1636||1674||
|-
|Earl Marischal (1458)||William Keith, 7th Earl Marischal||1635||1671||
|-
|Earl of Sutherland (1235)||John Gordon, 14th Earl of Sutherland||1615||1679||
|-
|rowspan=2|Earl of Mar (1114)||John Erskine, 19th Earl of Mar||1634||1654||Died
|-
|John Erskine, 20th Earl of Mar||1654||1668||
|-
|Earl of Rothes (1458)||John Leslie, 7th Earl of Rothes||1641||1681||
|-
|Earl of Morton (1458)||William Douglas, 9th Earl of Morton||1649||1681||
|-
|Earl of Menteith (1427)||William Graham, 7th Earl of Menteith||1598||1661||
|-
|Earl of Glencairn (1488)||William Cunningham, 9th Earl of Glencairn||1631||1664||
|-
|Earl of Eglinton (1507)||Alexander Montgomerie, 6th Earl of Eglinton||1612||1661||
|-
|Earl of Cassilis (1509)||John Kennedy, 6th Earl of Cassilis||1615||1668||
|-
|Earl of Caithness (1455)||George Sinclair, 6th Earl of Caithness||1643||1672||
|-
|Earl of Buchan (1469)||James Erskine, 7th Earl of Buchan||1628||1664||
|-
|rowspan=2|Earl of Moray (1562)||James Stewart, 4th Earl of Moray||1638||1653||Died
|-
|Alexander Stuart, 5th Earl of Moray||1653||1701||
|-
|rowspan=2|Earl of Linlithgow (1600)||Alexander Livingston, 2nd Earl of Linlithgow||1621||1650||Died
|-
|George Livingston, 3rd Earl of Linlithgow||1650||1690||
|-
|rowspan=2|Earl of Winton (1600)||George Seton, 3rd Earl of Winton||1607||1650||Died
|-
|George Seton, 4th Earl of Winton||1650||1704||
|-
|Earl of Home (1605)||James Home, 3rd Earl of Home||1633||1666||
|-
|Earl of Perth (1605)||John Drummond, 2nd Earl of Perth||1611||1662||
|-
|Earl of Dunfermline (1605)||Charles Seton, 2nd Earl of Dunfermline||1622||1672||
|-
|rowspan=2|Earl of Wigtown (1606)||John Fleming, 2nd Earl of Wigtown||1619||1650||Died
|-
|John Fleming, 3rd Earl of Wigtown||1650||1665||
|-
|Earl of Abercorn (1606)||James Hamilton, 2nd Earl of Abercorn||1618||1670||
|-
|Earl of Kinghorne (1606)||Patrick Lyon, 3rd Earl of Kinghorne||1646||1695||
|-
|rowspan=2|Earl of Roxburghe (1616)||Robert Ker, 1st Earl of Roxburghe||1616||1650||Died
|-
|William Ker, 2nd Earl of Roxburghe||1650||1675||
|-
|Earl of Kellie (1619)||Alexander Erskine, 3rd Earl of Kellie||1643||1677||
|-
|rowspan=2|Earl of Buccleuch (1619)||Francis Scott, 2nd Earl of Buccleuch||1633||1651||Died
|-
|Mary Scott, 3rd Countess of Buccleuch||1651||1661||
|-
|Earl of Haddington (1619)||John Hamilton, 4th Earl of Haddington||1645||1669||
|-
|Earl of Nithsdale (1620)||Robert Maxwell, 2nd Earl of Nithsdale||1646||1667||
|-
|Earl of Galloway (1623)||James Stewart, 2nd Earl of Galloway||1649||1671||
|-
|rowspan=2|Earl of Seaforth (1623)||George Mackenzie, 2nd Earl of Seaforth||1633||1651||Died
|-
|Kenneth Mackenzie, 3rd Earl of Seaforth||1651||1678||
|-
|Earl of Lauderdale (1624)||John Maitland, 2nd Earl of Lauderdale||1645||1682||
|-
|Earl of Annandale (1625)||James Murray, 2nd Earl of Annandale||1640||1658||Died, title extinct
|-
|Earl of Tullibardine (1628)||James Murray, 2nd Earl of Tullibardine||1644||1670||
|-
|Earl of Atholl (1629)||John Murray, 2nd Earl of Atholl||1642||1703||
|-
|Earl of Lothian (1631)||William Kerr, 1st Earl of Lothian||1631||1675||
|-
|Earl of Airth (1633)||William Graham, 1st Earl of Airth||1633||1661||
|-
|Earl of Loudoun (1633)||John Campbell, 1st Earl of Loudoun||1633||1662||
|-
|rowspan=2|Earl of Kinnoull (1633)||George Hay, 3rd Earl of Kinnoull||1644||1650||Died
|-
|William Hay, 4th Earl of Kinnoull||1650||1677||
|-
|Earl of Dumfries (1633)||William Crichton, 2nd Earl of Dumfries||1643||1691||
|-
|Earl of Queensberry (1633)||James Douglas, 2nd Earl of Queensberry||1640||1671||
|-
|Earl of Stirling (1633)||Henry Alexander, 4th Earl of Stirling||1644||1691||
|-
|Earl of Elgin (1633)||Thomas Bruce, 1st Earl of Elgin||1633||1663||
|-
|rowspan=2|Earl of Southesk (1633)||David Carnegie, 1st Earl of Southesk||1633||1658||Died
|-
|James Carnegie, 2nd Earl of Southesk||1658||1669||
|-
|rowspan=2|Earl of Traquair (1633)||John Stewart, 1st Earl of Traquair||1633||1659||Died
|-
|John Stewart, 2nd Earl of Traquair||1659||1666||
|-
|rowspan=2|Earl of Ancram (1633)||Robert Kerr, 1st Earl of Ancram||1633||1654||Died
|-
|Charles Kerr, 2nd Earl of Ancram||1654||1690||
|-
|Earl of Wemyss (1633)||David Wemyss, 2nd Earl of Wemyss||1649||1679||
|-
|Earl of Dalhousie (1633)||William Ramsay, 1st Earl of Dalhousie||1633||1672||
|-
|rowspan=3|Earl of Findlater (1638)||James Ogilvy, 1st Earl of Findlater||1638||1653||Died
|-
|Patrick Ogilvy, 2nd Earl of Findlater||1653||1658||Died
|-
|James Ogilvy, 3rd Earl of Findlater||1658||1711||
|-
|Earl of Airlie (1639)||James Ogilvy, 1st Earl of Airlie||1639||1665||
|-
|rowspan=2|Earl of Carnwath (1639)||Robert Dalzell, 1st Earl of Carnwath||1639||1654||Died
|-
|Gavin Dalzell, 2nd Earl of Carnwath||1654||1674||
|-
|Earl of Callendar (1641)||James Livingston, 1st Earl of Callendar||1641||1674||
|-
|Earl of Leven (1641)||Alexander Leslie, 1st Earl of Leven||1641||1661||
|-
|Earl of Forth (1642)||Patrick Ruthven, 1st Earl of Forth||1642||1651||Died, title extinct
|-
|rowspan=2|Earl of Hartfell (1643)||William Murray, 1st Earl of Dysart||1643||1655||Died
|-
|James Johnstone, 2nd Earl of Hartfell||1655||1672||
|-
|rowspan=2|Earl of Dysart (1643)||Robert Dalzell, 1st Earl of Carnwath||1643||1654||Died
|-
|Elizabeth Tollemache, 2nd Countess of Dysart||1654||1698||
|-
|Earl of Dirletoun (1646)||James Maxwell, 1st Earl of Dirletoun||1646||1650||Died, title extinct
|-
|Earl of Panmure (1646)||Patrick Maule, 1st Earl of Panmure||1646||1661||
|-
|Earl of Selkirk (1646)||William Hamilton, 1st Earl of Selkirk||1646||1694||
|-
|rowspan=2|Earl of Tweeddale (1646)||John Hay, 1st Earl of Tweeddale||1646||1653||Died
|-
|John Hay, 2nd Earl of Tweeddale||1653||1697||
|-
|Earl of Northesk (1647)||John Carnegie, 1st Earl of Northesk||1647||1667||
|-
|Earl of Kincardine (1647)||Edward Bruce, 1st Earl of Kincardine||1647||1662||
|-
|rowspan=2|Earl of Balcarres (1651)||Alexander Lindsay, 1st Earl of Balcarres||1651||1659||New creation, died
|-
|Charles Lindsay, 2nd Earl of Balcarres||1659||1662||
|-
|Earl of Ormond (1651)||Archibald Douglas, 1st Earl of Ormond||1651||1655||New creation; the letters patent conferring the titles did not pass the Great Seal and consequently were of no effect
|-
|Viscount of Falkland (1620)||Henry Cary, 4th Viscount of Falkland||1649||1663||
|-
|Viscount of Dunbar (1620)||John Constable, 2nd Viscount of Dunbar||1645||1668||
|-
|Viscount of Stormont (1621)||David Murray, 4th Viscount of Stormont||1658||1668||Title previously held by the Earl of Annandale
|-
|Viscount of Kenmure (1633)||Robert Gordon, 4th Viscount of Kenmure||1643||1663||
|-
|rowspan=2|Viscount of Arbuthnott (1641)||Robert Arbuthnot, 1st Viscount of Arbuthnott||1641||1655||Died
|-
|Robert Arbuthnot, 2nd Viscount of Arbuthnott||1655||1682||
|-
|Viscount of Dudhope (1641)||John Scrymgeour, 3rd Viscount of Dudhope||1644||1668||
|-
|rowspan=2|Viscount of Frendraught (1642)||James Crichton, 1st Viscount of Frendraught||1642||1650||Died
|-
|James Crichton, 2nd Viscount of Frendraught||1650||1678||
|-
|Viscount of Newburgh (1647)||James Levingston, 1st Viscount of Newburgh||1647||1670||
|-
|Viscount of Oxfuird (1651)||James Makgill, 1st Viscount of Oxfuird||1651||1663||New creation
|-
|Viscount of Kingston (1651)||Alexander Seton, 1st Viscount of Kingston||1651||1691||New creation
|-
|Lord Somerville (1430)||James Somerville, 10th Lord Somerville||1640||1677||
|-
|Lord Forbes (1442)||Alexander Forbes, 10th Lord Forbes||1641||1672||
|-
|Lord Saltoun (1445)||Alexander Abernethy, 9th Lord Saltoun||1612||1668||
|-
|Lord Gray (1445)||Andrew Gray, 7th Lord Gray||1611||1663||
|-
|Lord Sinclair (1449)||John Sinclair, 9th Lord Sinclair||1615||1676||
|-
|Lord Borthwick (1452)||John Borthwick, 9th Lord Borthwick||1623||1675||
|-
|rowspan=2|Lord Boyd (1454)||James Boyd, 9th Lord Boyd||1640||1654||Died
|-
|William Boyd, 10th Lord Boyd||1654||1692||
|-
|Lord Oliphant (1455)||Patrick Oliphant, 6th Lord Oliphant||1631||1680||
|-
|Lord Cathcart (1460)||Alan Cathcart, 6th Lord Cathcart||1628||1709||
|-
|Lord Lovat (1464)||Hugh Fraser, 8th Lord Lovat||1646||1672||
|-
|Lord Sempill (1489)||Robert Sempill, 7th Lord Sempill||1644||1675||
|-
|Lord Herries of Terregles (1490)||John Maxwell, 7th Lord Herries of Terregles||1631||1677||
|-
|rowspan=2|Lord Ross (1499)||William Ross, 10th Lord Ross||1648||1656||Died
|-
|George Ross, 11th Lord Ross||1656||1682||
|-
|rowspan=2|Lord Elphinstone (1509)||Alexander Elphinstone, 6th Lord Elphinstone||1648||1654||Died
|-
|Alexander Elphinstone, 7th Lord Elphinstone||1654||1669||
|-
|rowspan=2|Lord Ochiltree (1543)||James Stewart, 4th Lord Ochiltree||1615||1658||Died
|-
|William Stewart, 5th Lord Ochiltree||1658||1675||
|-
|Lord Torphichen (1564)||Walter Sandilands, 6th Lord Torphichen||1649||1696||
|-
|Lord Spynie (1590)||George Lindsay, 3rd Lord Spynie||1646||1671||
|-
|Lord Lindores (1600)||James Leslie, 3rd Lord Lindores||1649||1666||
|-
|rowspan=3|Lord Colville of Culross (1604)||James Colville, 2nd Lord Colville of Culross||1629||1654||Died
|-
|William Colville, 3rd Lord Colville of Culross||1654||1656||Died
|-
|John Colville, 4th Lord Colville of Culross||1656||1680||
|-
|Lord Balmerinoch (1606)||John Elphinstone, 3rd Lord Balmerino||1649||1704||
|-
|Lord Blantyre (1606)||Alexander Stewart, 4th Lord Blantyre||1641||1670||
|-
|Lord Coupar (1607)||James Elphinstone, 1st Lord Coupar||1607||1669||
|-
|Lord Balfour of Burleigh (1607)||Robert Balfour, 2nd Lord Balfour of Burleigh||1619||1663||
|-
|Lord Cranstoun (1609)||William Cranstoun, 3rd Lord Cranstoun||1648||1664||
|-
|Lord Maderty (1609)||David Drummond, 3rd Lord Madderty||1647||1692||
|-
|Lord Dingwall (1609)||Elizabeth Preston, 2nd Lady Dingwall||1628||1684||
|-
|Lord Cardross (1610)||David Erskine, 2nd Lord Cardross||1634||1671||
|-
|Lord Melville of Monymaill (1616)||George Melville, 4th Lord Melville||1643||1707||
|-
|Lord Aston of Forfar (1627)||Walter Aston, 2nd Lord Aston of Forfar||1639||1678||
|-
|Lord Fairfax of Cameron (1627)||Thomas Fairfax, 3rd Lord Fairfax of Cameron||1648||1671||
|-
|Lord Napier (1627)||Archibald Napier, 2nd Lord Napier||1645||1660||
|-
|Lord Reay (1628)||John Mackay, 2nd Lord Reay||1649||1681||
|-
|rowspan=2|Lord Cramond (1628)||Elizabeth Richardson, 1st Lady Cramond||1628||1651||Died
|-
|Thomas Richardson, 2nd Lord Cramond||1651||1674||
|-
|Lord Lindsay of Balcarres (1633)||Alexander Lindsay, 2nd Lord Balcarres||1641||1659||Created Earl of Balcarres, see above
|-
|Lord Forbes of Pitsligo (1633)||Alexander Forbes, 2nd Lord Forbes of Pitsligo||1636||1690||
|-
|Lord Kirkcudbright (1633)||John Maclellan, 3rd Lord Kirkcudbright||1647||1664||
|-
|Lord Fraser (1633)||Andrew Fraser, 2nd Lord Fraser||1636||1674||
|-
|rowspan=2|Lord Forrester (1633)||George Forrester, 1st Lord Forrester||1633||1654||Died
|-
|James Baillie, 2nd Lord Forrester||1654||1676||
|-
|rowspan=2|Lord Bargany (1641)||John Hamilton, 1st Lord Bargany||1641||1658||Died
|-
|John Hamilton, 2nd Lord Bargany||1658||1693||
|-
|Lord Balvaird (1641)||David Murray, 2nd Lord Balvaird||1644||1664||Inherited the Viscountcy of Stormont, see above
|-
|Lord Eythin (1642)||James King, 1st Lord Eythin||1642||1652||Died, title extinct
|-
|Lord Banff (1642)||George Ogilvy, 1st Lord Banff||1642||1663||
|-
|Lord Elibank (1643)||Patrick Murray, 2nd Lord Elibank||1649||1661||
|-
|Lord Dunkeld (1645)||James Galloway, 1st Lord Dunkeld||1645||1660||
|-
|Lord Falconer of Halkerton (1646)||Alexander Falconer, 1st Lord Falconer of Halkerton||1646||1671||
|-
|rowspan=2|Lord Abercrombie (1647)||James Sandilands, 1st Lord Abercrombie||1647||1658||Died
|-
|James Sandilands, 2nd Lord Abercrombie||1658||1681||
|-
|Lord Belhaven and Stenton (1647)||John Hamilton, 1st Lord Belhaven and Stenton||1647||1679||
|-
|Lord Cochrane of Dundonald (1647)||William Cochrane, Lord Cochrane of Dundonald||1647||1685||
|-
|Lord Carmichael (1647)||James Carmichael, 1st Lord Carmichael||1647||1672||
|-
|Lord Duffus (1650)||Alexander Sutherland, 1st Lord Duffus||1650||1674||New creation
|-
|rowspan=2|Lord Rollo (1651)||Andrew Rollo, 1st Lord Rollo||1650||1659||New creation; died
|-
|James Rollo, 2nd Lord Rollo||1659||1669||
|-
|Lord Ruthven of Freeland (1650)||Thomas Ruthven, 1st Lord Ruthven of Freeland||1651||1673||New creation
|-
|}

Peerage of Ireland

|Marquess of Ormonde (1642)||James Butler, 1st Duke of Ormonde||1642||1688||
|-
|Marquess of Antrim (1645)||Randal MacDonnell, 1st Marquess of Antrim||1645||1683||
|-
|Marquess of Clanricarde (1646)||Ulick Burke, 1st Marquess of Clanricarde||1646||1657||Died, title extinct
|-
|Earl of Kildare (1316)||George FitzGerald, 16th Earl of Kildare||1620||1660||
|-
|rowspan=2|Earl of Waterford (1446)||John Talbot, 10th Earl of Waterford||1630||1654||Died
|-
|Francis Talbot, 11th Earl of Waterford||1654||1667||
|-
|Earl of Clanricarde (1543)||Richard Burke, 6th Earl of Clanricarde||1657||1666||Title previously held by the Marquess of Clanricarde
|-
|rowspan=2|Earl of Thomond (1543)||Barnabas O'Brien, 6th Earl of Thomond||1639||1657||Died
|-
|Henry O'Brien, 7th Earl of Thomond||1657||1691||
|-
|Earl of Castlehaven (1616)||James Tuchet, 3rd Earl of Castlehaven||1630||1684||
|-
|Earl of Cork (1620)||Richard Boyle, 2nd Earl of Cork||1643||1698||
|-
|Earl of Westmeath (1621)||Richard Nugent, 2nd Earl of Westmeath||1642||1684||
|-
|Earl of Roscommon (1622)||Wentworth Dillon, 4th Earl of Roscommon||1649||1685||
|-
|Earl of Londonderry (1622)||Weston Ridgeway, 3rd Earl of Londonderry||1641||1672||
|-
|rowspan=2|Earl of Meath (1627)||William Brabazon, 1st Earl of Meath||1627||1651||Died
|-
|Edward Brabazon, 2nd Earl of Meath||1651||1675||
|-
|Earl of Barrymore (1628)||Richard Barry, 2nd Earl of Barrymore||1642||1694||
|-
|Earl of Carbery (1628)||Richard Vaughan, 2nd Earl of Carbery||1634||1687||
|-
|Earl of Fingall (1628)||Luke Plunkett, 3rd Earl of Fingall||1649||1684||
|-
|Earl of Downe (1628)||Thomas Pope, 2nd Earl of Downe||1640||1660||
|-
|Earl of Desmond (1628)||George Feilding, 1st Earl of Desmond||1628||1665||
|-
|rowspan=2|Earl of Ardglass (1645)||Thomas Cromwell, 1st Earl of Ardglass||1645||1653||Died
|-
|Wingfield Cromwell, 2nd Earl of Ardglass||1653||1668||
|-
|Earl of Leinster (1646)||Robert Cholmondeley, 1st Earl of Leinster||1646||1659||Died, title extinct
|-
|Earl of Donegall (1647)||Arthur Chichester, 1st Earl of Donegall||1647||1675||
|-
|Earl of Cavan (1647)||Charles Lambart, 1st Earl of Cavan||1647||1660||
|-
|rowspan=2|Earl of Clanbrassil (1647)||James Hamilton, 1st Earl of Clanbrassil||1647||1659||Died
|-
|Henry Hamilton, 2nd Earl of Clanbrassil||1659||1675||
|-
|Earl of Inchiquin (1654)||Murrough O'Brien, 1st Earl of Inchiquin||1654||1674||New creation
|-
|Earl of Clancarty (1658)||Donough MacCarty, 1st Earl of Clancarty||1658||1665||New creation
|-
|Viscount Gormanston (1478)||Jenico Preston, 7th Viscount Gormanston||1643||1691||
|-
|rowspan=2|Viscount Mountgarret (1550)||Richard Butler, 3rd Viscount Mountgarret||1602||1651||Died
|-
|Edmund Butler, 4th Viscount Mountgarret||1651||1679||
|-
|Viscount Grandison (1621)||John Villiers, 3rd Viscount Grandison||1643||1661||
|-
|rowspan=2|Viscount Wilmot (1621)||Henry Wilmot, 2nd Viscount Wilmot||1644||1658||Created Earl of Rochester in the Peerage of England; died
|-
|Henry Wilmot, 3rd Viscount Wilmot||1658||1680||
|-
|Viscount Valentia (1622)||Francis Annesley, 1st Viscount Valentia||1642||1660||
|-
|Viscount Moore (1621)||Henry Moore, 3rd Viscount Moore||1643||1675||
|-
|Viscount Dillon (1622)||Thomas Dillon, 4th Viscount Dillon||1630||1672||
|-
|Viscount Loftus (1622)||Edward Loftus, 2nd Viscount Loftus||1643||1680||
|-
|rowspan=2|Viscount Beaumont of Swords (1622)||Sapcote Beaumont, 2nd Viscount Beaumont of Swords||1625||1658||Died
|-
|Thomas Beaumont, 3rd Viscount Beaumont of Swords||1658||1702||
|-
|rowspan=3|Viscount Netterville (1622)||Nicholas Netterville, 1st Viscount Netterville||1622||1654||Died
|-
|John Netterville, 2nd Viscount Netterville||1654||1659||Died
|-
|Nicholas Netterville, 3rd Viscount Netterville||1659||1689||
|-
|Viscount Montgomery (1622)||Hugh Montgomery, 3rd Viscount Montgomery||1642||1663||
|-
|Viscount Magennis (1623)||Arthur Magennis, 3rd Viscount Magennis||1639||1683||
|-
|rowspan=3|Viscount Kilmorey (1625)||Robert Needham, 2nd Viscount Kilmorey||1631||1653||Died
|-
|Robert Needham, 3rd Viscount Kilmorey||1653||1657||Died
|-
|Charles Needham, 4th Viscount Kilmorey||1657||1660||
|-
|Viscount Baltinglass (1627)||Thomas Roper, 2nd Viscount Baltinglass||1637||1670||
|-
|rowspan=2|Viscount Castleton (1627)||Peregrine Saunderson, 4th Viscount Castleton||1641||1650||Died
|-
|George Saunderson, 5th Viscount Castleton||1650||1714||
|-
|rowspan=2|Viscount Killultagh (1627)||Edward Conway, 2nd Viscount Killultagh||1631||1655||Died
|-
|Edward Conway, 3rd Viscount Killultagh||1655||1683||
|-
|rowspan=2|Viscount Mayo (1627)||Theobald Bourke, 3rd Viscount Mayo||1649||1652||Died
|-
|Theobald Bourke, 4th Viscount Mayo||1652||1676||
|-
|Viscount Sarsfield (1627)||David Sarsfield, 3rd Viscount Sarsfield||1648||1687||
|-
|Viscount Chaworth (1628)||Patrick Chaworth, 3rd Viscount Chaworth||1644||1693||
|-
|rowspan=2|Viscount Savile (1628)||Thomas Savile, 1st Viscount Savile||1628||1659||Died
|-
|James Savile, 2nd Viscount Savile||1659||1671||
|-
|Viscount Lumley (1628)||Richard Lumley, 1st Viscount Lumley||1628||1663||
|-
|Viscount Taaffe (1628)||Theobald Taaffe, 2nd Viscount Taaffe||1642||1677||
|-
|rowspan=2|Viscount Molyneux (1628)||Richard Molyneux, 2nd Viscount Molyneux||1636||1654||Died
|-
|Caryll Molyneux, 3rd Viscount Molyneux||1654||1699||
|-
|Viscount Monson (1628)||William Monson, 1st Viscount Monson||1628||1660||
|-
|Viscount Muskerry (1628)||Donough MacCarty, 2nd Viscount Muskerry||1640||1665||Created Earl of Clancarty, see above
|-
|Viscount Strangford (1628)||Philip Smythe, 2nd Viscount Strangford||1635||1708||
|-
|Viscount Scudamore (1628)||John Scudamore, 1st Viscount Scudamore||1628||1671||
|-
|Viscount Wenman (1628)||Thomas Wenman, 2nd Viscount Wenman||1640||1665||
|-
|Viscount Ranelagh (1628)||Arthur Jones, 2nd Viscount Ranelagh||1643||1669||
|-
|Viscount Bourke of Clanmories (1629)||Thomas Bourke, 2nd Viscount Bourke||1635||1650||Died, title succeeded by the Marquess of Clanricarde
|-
|rowspan=2|Viscount FitzWilliam (1629)||Thomas FitzWilliam, 1st Viscount FitzWilliam||1629||1650||Died
|-
|Oliver FitzWilliam, 2nd Viscount Fitzwilliam||1650||1667||
|-
|rowspan=2|Viscount Fairfax of Emley (1629)||Thomas Fairfax, 4th Viscount Fairfax of Emley||1648||1651||Died
|-
|Charles Fairfax, 5th Viscount Fairfax of Emley||1651||1711||
|-
|Viscount Ikerrin (1629)||Pierce Butler, 1st Viscount Ikerrin||1629||1674||
|-
|Viscount Clanmalier (1631)||Lewis O'Dempsey, 2nd Viscount Clanmalier||1638||1683||
|-
|Viscount Cullen (1642)||Charles Cokayne, 1st Viscount Cullen||1642||1661||
|-
|Viscount Carrington (1643)||Charles Smyth, 1st Viscount Carrington||1643||1665||
|-
|Viscount Tracy (1643)||Robert Tracy, 2nd Viscount Tracy||1648||1662||
|-
|rowspan=2|Viscount Bulkeley (1644)||Thomas Bulkeley, 1st Viscount Bulkeley||1644||1659||Died
|-
|Robert Bulkeley, 2nd Viscount Bulkeley||1659||1688||
|-
|rowspan=2|Viscount Bellomont (1645)||Henry Bard, 1st Viscount Bellomont||1645||1656||Died
|-
|Charles Rupert Bard, 2nd Viscount Bellomont||1656||1667||
|-
|Viscount Brouncker (1645)||William Brouncker, 2nd Viscount Brouncker||1645||1684||
|-
|Viscount Ogle (1645)||William Ogle, 1st Viscount Ogle||1645||1682||
|-
|Viscount Barnewall (1646)||Nicholas Barnewall, 1st Viscount Barnewall||1646||1663||
|-
|rowspan=2|Viscount Galmoye (1646)||Edward Butler, 1st Viscount of Galmoye||1646||1653||Died
|-
|Edward Butler, 2nd Viscount of Galmoye||1653||1667||
|-
|rowspan=3|Viscount Tara (1650)||Thomas Preston, 1st Viscount Tara||1650||1655||New creation, died
|-
|Anthony Preston, 2nd Viscount Tara||1655||1659||Died
|-
|Thomas Preston, 3rd Viscount Tara||1659||1674||
|-
|Baron Athenry (1172)||Francis de Bermingham, 12th Baron Athenry||1645||1677||
|-
|Baron Kingsale (1223)||Patrick de Courcy, 20th Baron Kingsale||1642||1663||
|-
|Baron Kerry (1223)||Patrick Fitzmaurice, 19th Baron Kerry||1630||1661||
|-
|Baron Slane (1370)||Charles Fleming, 15th Baron Slane||1641||1661||
|-
|Baron Howth (1425)||William St Lawrence, 12th Baron Howth||1643||1671||
|-
|Baron Trimlestown (1461)||Matthias Barnewall, 8th Baron Trimlestown||1539||1667||
|-
|Baron Dunsany (1462)||Patrick Plunkett, 9th Baron of Dunsany||1603||1668||
|-
|Baron Power (1535)||John Power, 5th Baron Power||1607||1661||
|-
|Baron Dunboyne (1541)||James Butler, 4th/14th Baron Dunboyne||1640||1662||
|-
|Baron Louth (1541)||Oliver Plunkett, 6th Baron Louth||1629||1679||
|-
|Baron Upper Ossory (1541)||Barnaby Fitzpatrick, 6th Baron Upper Ossory||1638||1666||
|-
|Baron Inchiquin (1543)||Murrough O'Brien, 6th Baron Inchiquin||1624||1674||Created Earl of Inchiquin, see above
|-
|Baron Bourke of Castleconnell (1580)||William Bourke, 6th Baron Bourke of Connell||1635||1665||
|-
|Baron Cahir (1583)||Pierce Butler, 4th Baron Cahir||1648||1676||
|-
|rowspan=2|Baron Hamilton (1617)||James Hamilton, 3rd Baron Hamilton of Strabane||1638||1655||Died
|-
|George Hamilton, 4th Baron Hamilton of Strabane||1655||1668||
|-
|rowspan=2|Baron Bourke of Brittas (1618)||Theobald Bourke, 1st Baron Bourke of Brittas||1618||1654||Died
|-
|John Bourke, 2nd Baron Bourke of Brittas||1654||1668||
|-
|Baron Mountjoy (1618)||Mountjoy Blount, 1st Baron Mountjoy||1618||1665||
|-
|rowspan=2|Baron Castle Stewart (1619)||Andrew Stewart, 3rd Baron Castle Stewart||1639||1650||Died
|-
|Josias Stewart, 4th Baron Castle Stewart||1650||1662||
|-
|Baron Folliot (1620)||Thomas Folliott, 2nd Baron Folliott||1622||1697||
|-
|Baron Maynard (1620)||William Maynard, 2nd Baron Maynard||1640||1699||
|-
|rowspan=2|Baron Gorges of Dundalk (1620)||Edward Gorges, 1st Baron Gorges of Dundalk||1620||1650||Died
|-
|Richard Gorges, 2nd Baron Gorges of Dundalk||1650||1712||
|-
|Baron Offaly (1620)||Lettice Digby, 1st Baroness Offaly||1620||1658||Died; title succeeded by the Earl of Kildare
|-
|Baron Digby (1620)||Kildare Digby, 2nd Baron Digby||1642||1661||
|-
|rowspan=2|Baron Fitzwilliam (1620)||William Fitzwilliam, 2nd Baron Fitzwilliam||1644||1658||Died
|-
|William Fitzwilliam, 3rd Baron Fitzwilliam||1658||1719||
|-
|Baron Caulfeild (1620)||William Caulfeild, 5th Baron Caulfield||1642||1671||
|-
|rowspan=2|Baron Aungier (1621)||Gerald Aungier, 2nd Baron Aungier of Longford||1632||1655||Died
|-
|Francis Aungier, 3rd Baron Aungier of Longford||1655||1700||
|-
|Baron Blayney (1621)||Edward Blayney, 3rd Baron Blayney||1646||1669||
|-
|Baron Brereton (1624)||William Brereton, 2nd Baron Brereton||1631||1664||
|-
|rowspan=2|Baron Herbert of Castle Island (1624)||Richard Herbert, 2nd Baron Herbert of Castle Island||1648||1655||Died
|-
|Edward Herbert, 3rd Baron Herbert of Castle Island||1655||1678||
|-
|Baron Baltimore (1625)||Cecilius Calvert, 2nd Baron Baltimore||1632||1675||
|-
|Baron Coleraine (1625)||Hugh Hare, 1st Baron Coleraine||1625||1667||
|-
|Baron Sherard (1627)||Bennet Sherard, 2nd Baron Sherard||1640||1700||
|-
|Baron Boyle of Broghill (1628)||Roger Boyle, 1st Baron Boyle of Broghill||1628||1679||
|-
|rowspan=2|Baron Alington (1642)||Giles Alington, 2nd Baron Alington||1648||1659||Died
|-
|William Alington, 3rd Baron Alington||1659||1685||
|-
|Baron Hawley (1646)||Francis Hawley, 1st Baron Hawley||1646||1684||
|-
|}

References

 

Lists of peers by decade
1650s in England
1650s in Ireland
17th century in England
17th century in Scotland
17th century in Ireland
Lists of 17th-century English people
17th-century Scottish peers
17th-century Irish people
Peers
Peers